The Super Series, also known as Torneio de Verão de Manaus was a pre-season tournament realized in 2015, in the city of Manaus, Amazonas between January 21 and 25. 

A curiosity about this tournament was that before the matches, instead of playing the Brazilian National Anthem, as usual, the clubs anthem was played.

Participants

Matches

Final standings

References  

CR Flamengo
2015 in Brazilian football
Defunct football competitions in Brazil